Labatut-Rivière is a commune in the Hautes-Pyrénées department in south-western France.

The Church of the Assumption
 The church was restored in 1846, while the most recent restoration work was carried out in 2007. There is a cemetery that includes a chapel to Darré Libéros.

See also
Communes of the Hautes-Pyrénées department

References

Communes of Hautes-Pyrénées